White rainbow may refer to:

 Moonbow, a rainbow produced by light reflected from the moon rather than from direct sunlight
 Fog bow, a rainbow produced by the tiny water droplets of fog, which has much weaker colors and can appear white
 the stage name of musician Adam Forkner
 White Rainbow (film), 2005 Indian Hindi-English film about widows, starring Sonali Kulkarni